"Whole Lotta Lovin" is a 1958 song by Fats Domino, written by Domino and Dave Bartholomew.

Background
The record won an Imperial Gold Record Award. To promote the comeback single Fats appeared on The Dick Clark Beechnut Show on November 8, 1958, with singers the Kalin Twins, Andy Williams, and Gordon MacRae. The lyrics begin "I got a whole lotta lovin' for you, true true love for you".

Chart performance
In the US, "Whole Lotta Lovin'" peaked at #2 on the Hot R&B Sides chart, and #6 on the Hot 100. The B-side to this recording was Fats Domino's version of Coquette.

Cover versions
The song was covered by:
The Shakers (a cover name for Kingsize Taylor and the Dominoes) 1964 
A.C. Reed on Chief Records 1964
Errol Dixon 1965
In 1972, Hank Williams Jr. and Lois Johnson covered the song as, "Whole Lotta Loving".  This version peaked at #22 on the Hot Country Singles chart.
Jean Steakley 1972
Professor Longhair on the album Crawfish Fiesta 1979
Blake Xolton (Martian Records/Dan Kessel) 1981 
Bobby Moore, a Belgian singer 1986
Trombone Shorty and Lenny Kravitz on the album Goin' Home: A Tribute to Fats Domino  2007
Tiny Morrie, a Spanish version entitled "Te Voy A Dar Mis Amores" in the 1970s.

References

1958 songs
Fats Domino songs
Songs written by Fats Domino
Songs written by Dave Bartholomew